John Chees(e)man may refer to:

John T. Cheeseman, businessman and politician in Newfoundland
John Cheseman, MP for New Romney
John Cheesman, Virginia politician